The medulla is a horizontal layer within a lichen thallus.  It is a loosely arranged layer of interlaced hyphae below the upper cortex and photobiont zone, but above the lower cortex. The medulla generally has a cottony appearance.  It is the widest layer of a heteromerous lichen thallus.

References

Fungal morphology and anatomy
Lichenology